Eldon "Eddie" Lee Whittler (July 7, 1935 – January 29, 2001), better known by his ring name Smasher Sloan, was an American professional wrestler. He wrestled for the World Wide Wrestling Federation from the 1960s till early 1970s, where he achieved his most success being a 1-time WWWF United States Tagteam champion along with Baron Mikel Scicluna.

Professional career 
Whittler was born on July 7, 1935, in Alton, Illinois. He was the oldest of three children of Margaret Laura (née Harsh; 1916–1995) and Eldon "Whitey" Lee Whittler (1913–1983),  who was also a professional wrestler. He made his debut in 1956 as Don Whittler. He initially competed in Championship Wrestling from Florida. 

They challenged the reigning champions, Johnny Valentine and Tony Parisi on September 22 on a house show in Washington D.C in a traditional 2-out-of-3 falls match. Valentine and Parisi won the first fall, but then Johnny suddenly turned heel in the second round, when he turned on Parisi and threw him out of the ring. 

By 1968, Sloan had left WWWF. He then joined the NWA Big-time Wrestling based in Dallas, Texas which was then managed by Wrestler and promoter Fritz Von Erich. There Sloan (Spoiler #2) teamed up with Don Jardine (Spoiler #1) becoming the team known as the Spoilers. They were managed by Gary Hart and went on to win the NWA American Tagteam Championship from the team of Fritz and Billy Red Lyons in 1968. He was eventually unmasked at a house show and left the territory. He also went on to win the NWA Tennessee Tag Team Championship in the NWA Mid-America territory with The Spoiler in 1970.

Championships
NWA Big Time Wrestling 
NWA American Tag Team Championship (1 time) – with The Spoiler
NWA Brass Knuckles Championship (Texas version) (1 time)
NWA Mid-America
NWA Tennessee Tag Team Championship (1 time) - with Spoiler
World Wide Wrestling Federation
WWWF United States Tag Team Championship (1-Time) - with Baron Mikel Scicluna

References

1935 births
2001 deaths
American male professional wrestlers
Professional wrestlers from Illinois
20th-century professional wrestlers
WCWA Brass Knuckles Champions